Qalqilya Zoo is a small  zoo in the Palestinian city of Qalqilya on the western edge of the West Bank. Established in 1986, it is the only zoo in the State of Palestine. The zoo houses 170 animals, a small Natural History museum, a children's entertainment park, and on-site restaurants.

History

The zoo was the brainchild of the former mayor of Qalqilya. Israeli zoos helped to stock it and it was designed as a symbol of Arab-Israeli cooperation. When it opened in 1986, the zoo was considered a "jewel in the crown of Palestinian national institutions." It became a popular attraction and was later expanded to accommodate the increasing flow of visitors, which included both Arabs and Israelis.

After the outbreak of the Second Intifada, visitors from outside Qalqilya were barred entry. In 2003, the Israeli authorities allowed group visits arranged in advance. A child playing outside the main entrance of the zoo on a public holiday was killed by indiscriminate fire which led to a brief drop in visitors. The zoo's survival has been attributed to the hard work and dedication of its resident veterinarian, Sami Khadr, and his staff.

During the intifada, "Dubi", the zoo's only male giraffe, from South Africa, frightened by the sound of gunfire, was killed when it ran into a pole. "Ruti", his pregnant partner, miscarried ten days later. Both animals can now be seen stuffed at the zoo's museum. In 2002, three zebras died after inhaling tear gas used to break up a demonstration at a high school adjacent to the zoo. Mr. Khadr applied taxidermy to preserve some of the animals, including the giraffe, the unborn calf, the zebras, a monkey, wildcats and snakes.

Since its inception, an Israeli veterinarian, Motke Levison, has helped out at the zoo, providing phone consultations and meeting with Khadr to deliver emergency medical supplies. Levison has served as a mediator, helping the zoo acquire new animals. Three lions, three ibex desert goats and two zebras were donated by the Ramat Gan Safari park in September 2004. The lions were meant to be transferred to Qalqilya in 2000, but the outbreak of the Second Intifada delayed the delivery. Saeed Daoud, director of the Qalqilya Zoo, dubbed the three lions, who were named Jafer, Jaras and Naboko, "the kings of peace." According to Khadr, the Ramat Gan zoo also sent him monkeys, an ostrich, and raccoons.

Zoo grounds

The zoo houses lions, brown bears, crocodiles, ostriches, camels, deers, gazelles, zebras, birds, lizards, snakes, and monkeys of various types. There is also a hippopotamus named Dubi, who shares his small concrete wading pool with a family of peacocks. In December 2003, the zoo was described in The Guardian as "one of the West Bank's more pleasant surprises [...] there is a small but beautiful landscaped park. [...] And amid the trees, in spacious, clean enclosures, a lioness, an ostrich, a family of bears, a pool full of crocodiles." The animals have ample room to move around with some enclosures as big as those in the London Zoo.

The zoo can be reached by taking a service taxi from the city center. The zoo also has a children's entertainment park, part of which is inside what used to be a swimming pool.

Museum 
After their deaths, animals from the zoo have been taxidermized by the resident veterinarian, a self-taught taxidermist. School children are frequent visitors to the zoo's "colorful, highly eccentric Natural History Museum." Almost 100 exotic animals are displayed in it.

See also
Gaza Zoo

References

Zoos in the State of Palestine
Zoo
1986 establishments in the Palestinian territories
Zoos established in 1986